February 26 - Eastern Orthodox liturgical calendar - February 28

All fixed commemorations below are observed on March 12 (March 11 on leap years) by Eastern Orthodox Churches on the Old Calendar.

For February 27th, Orthodox Churches on the Old Calendar commemorate the Saints listed on February 14.

Saints

 Martyrs Julian and his disciple Eunos (Kronion), at Alexandria (250- 252)
 Martyrs Abundius, Alexander, Antigonus, Calanus, Januarius, Makarios, Severianus, Titianus and Fortunatus, and those martyred with them (c. 284–305) 
 Martyr Gelasius the Actor, of Heliopolis (297)
 Martyr Nesius, by whipping.
 Saint Macarius of Jerusalem, Bishop of Jerusalem (334)
 Saint Thalelaeus of Syria, hermit, of Gabala in Syria (c. 460)
 Saints Asclepius and Jacob of Nimouza, monks near Cyrrhus (5th century)
 Saint Stephen, monk, of Constantinople (614)
 Venerable Procopius the Confessor, of Decapolis (c. 750)
 Saint Timothy of Caesarea, monk.

Pre-Schism Western saints

 Saint Honorina (Honorine), an early martyr in the north of France.
 Saint Comgan, Abbot of Glenthsen or Killeshin in Ireland (c. 565)
 Saint Leander of Seville, Archbishop of Seville (600)
 Saint Baldomerus (Galmier), by trade a locksmith in Lyons in France, who entered the monastery of St Justus (c. 650)
 Saint Ælfnoth of Stowe (Alnoth), a hermit at Stowe near Bugbrooke, martyred by robbers (c. 700)
 Saint Herefrith of Louth, Bishop of Lincolnshire (c. 873)
 Saint John of Gorze, Abbot of Gorze (c. 975)

Post-Schism Orthodox saints

 Venerable Titus, hieromonk of the Kiev Caves Monastery (1196)
 Saint Titus the Soldier, monk of the Kiev Caves (14th century)
 Saint Pitirim, Bishop of Tambov (1698) 
 New Martyr Elias of Trebizond (1749)
 Venerable Archimandrite Photius of the Yuriev Monastery, Novgorod (1838)
 Saint Raphael of Brooklyn, Good Shepherd of the Lost Sheep in America (1915) (New Calendar only see also: February 14)

New martyrs and confessors

 New Hieromartyr Sergei Uvitsky, Priest (1932)
 New Hieromartyr Peter Uspensky, Priest (1938) 
 Martyr Michael Markov (1938)  
 Venerable Elder Ephraim of Katounakia (1998) (see also: February 14)

Other commemorations

 Twelve Holy Greek Architects of the Kiev Caves Lavra.
 Repose of Archimandrite Photius of the Yuriev Monastery, Novgorod (1838) 
 Repose of Monk Anthony of Valaam Monastery (1848) 
 Repose of Hieromonk Justinian of Valaam Monastery (1966) 
 Repose of Archimandrite Alypy (Voronov) of the Pskov-Caves Monastery (1975)

Icon gallery

Notes

References

Sources
 February 27 / March 12. Orthodox Calendar (Pravoslavie.ru).
 March 12 / February 27. Holy Trinity Russian Orthodox Church (A parish of the Patriarchate of Moscow).
 February 27. OCA - The Lives of the Saints.
 The Autonomous Orthodox Metropolia of Western Europe and the Americas. St. Hilarion Calendar of Saints for the year of our Lord 2004. St. Hilarion Press (Austin, TX). p. 18.
 The Twenty-Seventh Day of the Month of February. Orthodoxy in China.
 February 27. Latin Saints of the Orthodox Patriarchate of Rome.
 The Roman Martyrology. Transl. by the Archbishop of Baltimore. Last Edition, According to the Copy Printed at Rome in 1914. Revised Edition, with the Imprimatur of His Eminence Cardinal Gibbons. Baltimore: John Murphy Company, 1916. pp. 60–61.
 Rev. Richard Stanton. A Menology of England and Wales, or, Brief Memorials of the Ancient British and English Saints Arranged According to the Calendar, Together with the Martyrs of the 16th and 17th Centuries. London: Burns & Oates, 1892. pp. 86–98.
Greek Sources
 Great Synaxaristes:  27 Φεβρουαρίου. Μεγασ Συναξαριστησ.
  Συναξαριστής. 27 Φεβρουαρίου. Ecclesia.gr. (H Εκκλησια τησ Ελλαδοσ). 
Russian Sources
  12 марта (27 февраля). Православная Энциклопедия под редакцией Патриарха Московского и всея Руси Кирилла (электронная версия). (Orthodox Encyclopedia - Pravenc.ru).
  27 февраля (ст.ст.) 12 марта 2014 (нов. ст.). Русская Православная Церковь Отдел внешних церковных связей. (DECR).

February in the Eastern Orthodox calendar